The Pierre P. Ferry House (1903–1906) is a historic home in Seattle, Washington, United States.

History
The American Craftsman home was designed for attorney Pierre Ferry by Seattle architect John Graham.  The art glass windows in the main hall with the elaborate peacock were designed by Tiffany Studios.  Orlando Giannini of the Chicago firm Giannini & Hilgart designed the mosaic with its wisteria motif.  It is regarded as the finest Arts and Crafts residence in the Pacific Northwest.

The building has status as a Seattle landmark and is listed on the National Register of Historic Places.

References

External links

1904 establishments in Washington (state)
American Craftsman architecture in Washington (state)
Capitol Hill, Seattle
Houses completed in 1904
Houses in Seattle
Houses on the National Register of Historic Places in Washington (state)
National Register of Historic Places in Seattle